The Park Avenue Bridge in Clifton, Arizona brings Park Avenue over the San Francisco River and was long the one link between east and west sides of the town.  It is a historic through truss bridge, built during 1917–18, and is listed on the U.S. National Register of Historic Places.  It has also been known as Clifton Bridge and as Riley Bridge.

It is significant historically as the only pinned Parker vehicular truss in the state of Arizona.  At the time of its NRHP listing, in 1988, it was in original condition including having a creosoted timber deck.

It was individually listed on the National Register of Historic Places (NRHP) in 1988.  It was also included as a contributing structure within the Clifton Townsite Historic District, a historic district listed on the NRHP in 1990.

References 

Road bridges on the National Register of Historic Places in Arizona
Bridges completed in 1918
Buildings and structures in Greenlee County, Arizona
History of Greenlee County, Arizona
Tourist attractions in Greenlee County, Arizona
1918 establishments in Arizona
National Register of Historic Places in Greenlee County, Arizona
Individually listed contributing properties to historic districts on the National Register in Arizona
Steel bridges in the United States
Parker truss bridges in the United States